Roy Liuzza is an American scholar of Old English literature. A professor at the University of Tennessee in Knoxville, Liuzza is the former editor of the Old English Newsletter. He has published a translation of Beowulf which was well-received and praised for its readability and correspondence with the original, besides scholarly monographs and articles, including many on translating and dating Beowulf.

Notes

References

External links
Faculty page at University of Tennessee

Living people
Translators from Old English
University of Tennessee faculty
Year of birth missing (living people)